Black Roses is a 1929 novel by the British writer Francis Brett Young. Paul Ritchie an English painter is on a cruise around the Mediterranean, when the ship pulls into Naples. This sparks his memories of many decades before when he had lived in the city and found friendship with a fellow artist and love with their landlady. However all three were struck down during a cholera epidemic of which only Ritchie survived. Without ever setting foot back in the city, he is finally able to banish the ghosts that have haunted him all these years.

During the 1920s Young spent a great deal of his time in Capri. He generally set his novels in places he knew well as seen with his East African and Mercian novels.

References

Bibliography
 Michael Hall. Francis Brett Young. Seren, 1997.

1929 British novels
Novels by Francis Brett Young
Novels set in Italy
Heinemann (publisher) books